Furry Weekend Atlanta (FWA) is a furry convention held annually in Atlanta, Georgia.

History 
Furry Weekend Atlanta started as an outgrowth of a local furry meetups often held in Atlanta at the homes of various members of the furry fandom. As the gatherings became larger, the idea of formally holding a convention was raised. After several unsuccessful attempts, a plan was made to hold a convention in February 2004. The name Furry Weekend Atlanta was chosen to echo the name of the anime convention held in the city, Anime Weekend Atlanta. The name became a federally registered trademark on December 2, 2008. Originally held around Valentine's Day, the convention was rescheduled to be held mid-March in 2009. In January 2022, Furry Weekend Atlanta's Twitter announced they have partnered with the Hilton Atlanta hotel nearby as a ‘overflow hotel’ for their upcoming convention later this year.

Organization 
Furry Weekend Atlanta, Inc., is the 501(c)(3) non-profit corporation which organizes the Furry Weekend Atlanta convention. Furry Weekend Atlanta Inc. is headed by an executive committee and in addition to operating the annual convention, promotes the acceptance of the furry fandom in the southeast United States. Furry Weekend Atlanta, Inc. retains only the funds necessary for the organization of the Furry Weekend Atlanta convention, and donates the rest to charities.

Charity 
From 2005 to 2006, Furry Weekend Atlanta supported the Ellijay Wildlife Rehabilitation Sanctuary, a state and federally licensed wildlife rehabilitation center located in Ellijay, Georgia. Furry Weekend Atlanta attendees donated almost $4,000 to the Sanctuary in 2006, and almost $3,000 in 2005. From 2007 to present, Furry Weekend Atlanta has supported the Conservator's Center, a nonprofit organization working to preserve threatened species.

Furry Weekend Atlanta by year

References

External links 

Furry Weekend Atlanta – official website
Furry Weekend Atlanta at WikiFur

Furry conventions
Recurring events established in 2004
Conventions in Atlanta
Tourist attractions in Atlanta
Annual events in Georgia (U.S. state)